The 2017 Milwaukee Brewers season was the 48th season for the Brewers in Milwaukee, the 20th in the National League, and 49th overall. The Brewers were managed by Craig Counsell in his third season as manager. They finished the season 86–76 to finish six games behind the Chicago Cubs in the National League Central Division. The Brewers finished one game behind the Colorado Rockies for the second Wild Card spot. The season marked the first time the Brewers had finished above .500 in three years and their best season in terms of winning percentage since 2011.

Offseason

Trades and acquisitions

November 2016 
November 9, Yhonathan Barrios is signed as a free agent.
November 23, Blake Parker is claimed off of waivers from the Los Angeles Angels of Anaheim.
November 28, Steve Geltz is claimed off of waivers from the Tampa Bay Rays.
November 29, Eric Thames is signed as a free agent.

December 2016 
December 6, Tyler Thornburg is traded to the Boston Red Sox in exchange for Mauricio Dubon, Josh Pennington, Travis Shaw, and a player to be named later.
December 8, Tim Dillard is signed as a free agent.
December 8, Ryan Webb is signed as a free agent.
December 12, Ivan De Jesus is signed as a free agent.
December 13, Drew Gagnon and Martin Maldonado are traded to the Los Angeles Angels of Anaheim in exchange for Jett Bandy.
December 14, Tommy Milone is signed as a free agent.
December 15, Hiram Burgos is signed as a free agent.
December 15, Andy Oliver is signed as a free agent.
December 15, Eric Sogard is signed as a free agent.

January 2017 
January 9, Cody Decker is signed as a free agent.
January 19, Neftali Feliz is signed as a free agent.
January 21, Joba Chamberlain is signed as a free agent.
January 31, Ehire Adrianza is claimed off of waivers from the San Francisco Giants.

February 2017 
February 2, Jesus Aguilar is claimed off of waivers from the Cleveland Indians.
February 14, Nick Noonan is signed as a free agent.

Regular season

Season standings

National League Central

National League Wild Card

Record vs. opponents

Game log

|-style="background:#fbb"
| 1 || April 3 || Rockies || 1:10  pm || 5–7 || Estévez (1–0) || Mariñez (0–1) || Holland (1)  || 0–1 || 43,336 || L1/Box
|-style="background:#fbb"
| 2 || April 4 || Rockies || 6:40 pm || 5–6 || Anderson (1–0) || Davies (0–1) || Holland (2) || 0–2 || 21,458 || L2/Box
|-style="background:#cfc"
| 3 || April 5 || Rockies || 7:10 pm || 6–1 || Peralta (1–0) || Chatwood (0–1) || Feliz (1) || 1–2 || 21,824 || W1/Box 
|-style="background:#fbb"
| 4 || April 6 || Rockies || 12:40pm || 1–2 || Dunn (1–0) || Feliz (0–1) || Holland (3) || 1–3 || 23,828 || L1/Box
|-style="background:#cfc"
| 5 || April 7 || Cubs || 7:10 pm || 2–1 (11) || Hughes (1–0) || Montgomery (0–2) || — || 2–3 || 28,728 || W1/Box
|-style="background:#fbb"
| 6 || April 8 || Cubs || 6:10 pm || 6–11 || Hendricks (1–0) || Mariñez (0–2) || — || 2–4 || 43,080 || L1/Box
|-style="background:#fbb"
| 7 || April 9 || Cubs || 1:10 pm || 4–7 || Arrieta (2–0) || Davies (0–2) || — || 2–5 || 38,483 || L2/Box
|-style="background:#cfc"
| 8 || April 11 || @ Blue Jays || 6:07 pm || 4–3 || Peralta (2–0) || Happ (0–2) || Feliz (2) || 3–5 || 48,456 || W1/Box
|-style="background:#cfc"
| 9 || April 12 || @ Blue Jays || 6:07 pm || 2–0 || Anderson (1–0) || Stroman (1–1) || Feliz (3) || 4–5 || 29,919 || W2/Box
|-style="background:#cfc"
| 10 || April 13 || @ Reds || 6:10 pm || 5–1 || Nelson (1–0) || Arroyo (0–2) || — || 5–5 || 13,574 || W3/Box
|-style="background:#cfc"
| 11 || April 14 || @ Reds || 6:10 pm || 10–4 || Milone (1–0) || Wood (0–1) || — || 6–5 || 23,850 || W4/Box
|-style="background:#fbb;"
| 12 || April 15 || @ Reds || 12:10pm || 5–7 || Iglesias (1–0) || Torres (0–1) || Lorenzen (1) || 6–6 || 31,008 || L1/Box
|-style="background:#cfc"
| 13 || April 16 || @ Reds || 12:10pm || 4–2 || Peralta (3–0) || Romano (0–1) || Feliz (4) || 7–6 || 12,625 || W1/Box
|-style="background:#cfc"
| 14 || April 17 || @ Cubs || 7:05 pm || 6–3 || Anderson (2–0) || Lackey (1–2) || Feliz (5) || 8–6 || 38,636 || W2/Box 
|-style="background:#fbb;"
| 15 || April 18 || @ Cubs || 7:05 pm || 7–9 || Grimm (1–0) || Hughes (1–1) || Davis (3) || 8–7 || 39,026 || L1/Box
|-style="background:#fbb"
| 16 || April 19 || @ Cubs || 1:20 pm || 4–7 || Davis (2–0) || Feliz (0–2) || — || 8–8 || 34,864 || L2/Box
|-style="background:#cfc"
| 17 || April 20 || Cardinals || 7:10 pm || 7–5 || Davies (1–2) || Martínez (0–3) || Barnes (1) || 9–8 || 26,451 || W1/Box
|-style="background:#fbb"
| 18 || April 21 || Cardinals || 7:10 pm || 3–6 || Wainwright (1–3) || Peralta (3–1) || Oh (3) || 9–9 || 23,126 || L1/Box
|-style="background:#fbb"
| 19 || April 22 || Cardinals || 6:10 pm || 1–4 || Lynn (2–1) || Torres (0–2) || Oh (4) || 9–10 || 30,865 || L2/Box
|-style="background:#fbb;"
| 20 || April 23 || Cardinals || 1:10 pm || 4–6 || Leake (3–1) || Nelson (1–1) || Oh (5) || 9–11 || 31,158 || L3/Box
|-style="background:#cfc"
| 21 || April 24 || Reds || 6:40 pm || 11–7 || Torres (1–2) || Garrett (2–2) || — || 10–11 || 23,943 || W1/Box
|-style="background:#cfc"
| 22 || April 25 || Reds || 6:40 pm || 9–1 || Davies (2–2) || Feldman (1–2) || Milone (1) || 11–11 || 28,449 || W2/Box
|-style="background:#cfc"
| 23 || April 26 || Reds || 12:40pm || 9–4 || Peralta (4–1) || Davis (0–1) || — || 12–11 || 19,062 || W3/Box 
|-style="background:#fbb"
| 24 || April 28 || Braves || 7:10 pm || 8–10 || Ramírez (1–1) || Feliz (0–3) || Johnson (4) || 12–12 || 26,453 || L1/Box
|-style="background:#fbb"
| 25 || April 29 || Braves || 6:10 pm || 3–11 || García (1–1) || Nelson (1–2) || — || 12–13 || 30,026 || L2/Box
|-style="background:#cfc"
| 26 || April 30 || Braves || 1:10 pm || 4–3 || Garza (1–0) || Foltynewicz (0–3) || Feliz (6) || 13–13 || 24,395 || W1/Box

|-style="background:#cfc"
| 27 || May 1 || @ Cardinals || 7:15 pm || 7–5 (10) || Drake (1–0) || Oh (1–1) || Feliz (7) || 14–13 || 36,339 || W2/Box
|-style="background:#fbb"
| 28 || May 2 || @ Cardinals || 7:15 pm || 1–2 || Martínez (1–3) || Peralta (4–2) || Rosenthal (3) || 14–14 || 38,616 || L1/Box
|-style="background:#bbbbbb;"
| — || May 3 || @ Cardinals || 7:15 pm || colspan=7| Postponed (rain) (Rescheduled for June 13) 
|-style="background:#cfc"
| 29 || May 4 || @ Cardinals || 6:15 pm || 5–4 || Drake (2–0) || Bowman (1–1) || Feliz (8) || 15–14 || 36,250 || W1/Box
|-style="background:#fbb"
| 30 || May 5 || @ Pirates || 6:05 pm || 0–4 || LeBlanc (2–0) || Scahill (0–1) || — || 15–15 || 21,129 || L1/Box
|-style="background:#fbb"
| 31 || May 6 || @ Pirates || 6:05 pm || 1–2 (10) || Watson (1–0) || Torres (1–3) || — || 15–16 || 22,902 || L2/Box
|-style="background:#cfc"
| 32 || May 7 || @ Pirates || 12:35pm || 6–2 || Davies (3–2) || Glawnow (1–2) || — || 16–16 || 25,108 || W1/Box 
|-style="background:#cfc"
| 33 || May 9 || Red Sox || 6:40 pm || 11–7 || Torres (2–3) || Pomeranz (3–2) || — || 17–16 || 22,524 || W2/Box
|-style="background:#cfc"
| 34 || May 10 || Red Sox || 7:10 pm || 7–4 || Scahill (1–1) || Kendrick (0–2) || — || 18–16 || 23,095 || W3/Box
|-style="background:#fbb"
| 35 || May 11 || Red Sox || 12:10 pm || 1–4 || Kimbrel (2–0) || Feliz (0–4) || — || 18–17 || 26,499 || L1/Box
|-style="background:#cfc"
| 36 || May 12 || Mets || 7:10 pm || 7–4 || Garza (2–0) || Harvey (2–3) || Hughes (1) || 19–17 || 28,306 || W1/Box
|-style="background:#cfc"
| 37 || May 13 || Mets || 6:10 pm || 11–4 || Davies (4–2) || Gsellman (2–3) ||  || 20–17 || 33,849 || W2/Box
|-style="background:#cfc"
| 38 || May 14 || Mets || 1:10 pm || 11–9 || Feliz (1–4) || Reed (0–2) || Knebel (1) || 21–17 || 30,623 || W3/Box
|-style="background:#fbb"
| 39 || May 15 || @ Padres || 9:10 pm || 5–6 (10) || Torres (2–2) || Drake (2–1) ||  || 21–18 || 15,866 || L1/Box
|-style="background:#cfc"
| 40 || May 16 || @ Padres || 9:10 pm || 6–2 || Nelson (2–2) || Richard (2–5) ||  || 22–18 || 16,657 || W1/Box
|-style="background:#cfc"
| 41 || May 17 || @ Padres || 9:10 pm || 3–1 || Barnes (1–0) || Maurer (0–3) || Knebel (2) || 23–18 || 17,356 || W2/Box
|-style="background:#cfc"
| 42 || May 18 || @ Padres || 2:40 pm || 4–2 || Davies (5–2) || Quackenbush (0–1) || Knebel (3) || 24–18 || 14,359 || W3/Box
|-style="background:#cfc"
| 43 || May 19 || @ Cubs || 1:20 pm || 6–3 || Peralta (5–2) || Montgomery (0–3) || Torres (1) || 25–18 || 36,923 || W4/Box
|-style="background:#bbbbbb;"
| — || May 20 || @ Cubs || 1:20 pm ||colspan=7| Postponed (rain) (Rescheduled for July 6)
|-style="background:#fbb"
| 44 || May 21 || @ Cubs || 1:20 pm || 6–13 || Arrieta (5–3) || Anderson (2–1) ||  || 25–19 || 41,671 || L1/Box
|-style="background:#fbb"
| 45 || May 23 || Blue Jays || 6:40 pm || 3–4 || Barnes (1–2) || Nelson (2–3) || Osuna (7) || 25–20 || 30,742 || L2/Box
|-style="background:#fbb"
| 46 || May 24 || Blue Jays || 12:10pm || 4–8 || Stroman (5–2) || Garza (2–1) ||  || 25–21 || 26,607 || L3/Box
|-style="background:#fbb"
| 47 || May 25 || Diamondbacks || 7:10 pm || 0–4 || Ray (4–3) || Davies (5–3) ||  || 25–22 || 30,081 || L4/Box
|-style="background:#fbb"
| 48 || May 26 || Diamondbacks || 7:10 pm || 2–4 (10) || McFarland (2–0) || Peralta (5–3) || Rodney (13) || 25–23 || 25,391 || L5/Box
|-style="background:#cfc"
| 49 || May 27 || Diamondbacks || 3:10 pm || 6–1 || Anderson (3–1) || Greinke (6–3) ||  || 26–23 || 29,746 || W1/Box
|-style="background:#cfc"
| 50 || May 28 || Diamondbacks || 1:10 pm || 9–5 || Nelson (3–3) || Corbin (4–5) || Barnes (2) || 27–23 || 41,698 || W2/Box
|-style="background:#fbb"
| 51 || May 29 || @ Mets || 3:10 pm || 2–4 || Gsellman (3–3) || Garza (2–2) || Reed (7) || 27–24 || 34,830 || L1/Box 
|-style="background:#fbb"
| 52 || May 30 || @ Mets || 6:10 pm || 4–5 (12) || Smoker (1–2) || Peralta (5–4) ||  || 27–25 || 24,457 || L2/Box
|-style="background:#cfc"
| 53 || May 31 || @ Mets || 6:10 pm || 7–1 || Guerra (1–0) || deGrom (4–2) ||  || 28–25 || 26,517 || W1/Box

|-style="background:#cfc"
| 54 || June 1 || @ Mets || 12:10pm || 2–1 || Anderson (4–1) || Wheeler (3–3) || Knebel (4) || 29–25 || 35,123 || W2/Box
|-style="background:#fbb"
| 55 || June 2 || Dodgers || 7:10 pm || 1–2 (12) || Jansen (3–0) || Feliz (1–5) ||  || 29–26 || 30,140 || L1/Box
|-style="background:#fbb"
| 56 || June 3 || Dodgers || 3:10 pm || 8–10 || Morrow (2–0) || Torres (2–4) || Jansen (9) || 29–27 || 34,354 || L2/Box
|-style="background:#cfc"
| 57 || June 4 || Dodgers || 1:10 pm || 3–0 || Davies (6–3) || Maeda (4–3) || Knebel (5) || 30–27 || 30,330 || W1/Box
|-style="background:#fbb"
| 58 || June 5 || Giants || 6:40 pm || 2–7 || Samardzija (2–7) || Scahill (1–2) ||  || 30–28 || 21,452 || L1/Box
|-style="background:#cfc"
| 59 || June 6 || Giants || 6:40  pm || 5–2 || Anderson (5–1) || Cain (3–5) || Knebel (6) || 31–28 || 21,214 || W1/Box
|-style="background:#cfc"
| 60 || June 7 || Giants || 7:10  pm || 6–3 || Nelson (4–3) || Blach (4–3) || Knebel (7) || 32–28 || 20,580 || W2/Box
|-style="background:#fbb"
| 61 || June 8 || Giants || 1:10 pm || 5–9 (10) || Melancon (1–1) || Barnes (1–1) ||  || 32–29 || 23,005 || L1/Box
|-style="background:#cfc"
| 62 || June 9 || @ Diamondbacks || 8:40 pm || 8–6 || Davies (7–3) || McFarland (3–1) || Knebel (8) || 33–29 || 25,009 || W1/Box
|-style="background:#fbb"
| 63 || June 10 || @ Diamondbacks || 9:10 pm || 2–3 || Godley (2–1) || Guerra (1–1) || Rodney (16) || 33–30 || 40,195 || L1/Box
|-style="background:#fbb"
| 64 || June 11 || @ Diamondbacks || 3:10 pm || 1–11 || Ray (7–3) || Anderson (5–2) ||  || 33–31 || 30,370 ||L2/Box
|-style="background:#fbb"
| 65 || June 13 || @ Cardinals || 1:15 pm || 0–6 || Lynn (5–3) || Suter (0–1) || Lyons (1) || 33–32 || 40,083 ||L3/Box
|-style="background:#cfc"
| 66 || June 13 || @ Cardinals || 7:15 pm || 8–5 || Hughes (2–1) || Rosenthal (1–3) || Knebel (9) || 34–32 || 40,115 || W1/Box
|-style="background:#cfc"
| 67 || June 14 || @ Cardinals || 7:15 pm || 7–6 || Garza (3–2)  || Leake (5–6) || Knebel (10) || 35–32 || 38,061 || W2/Box
|-style="background:#cfc"
| 68 || June 15 || @ Cardinals || 6:15 pm || 6–4 || Torres (3–4) || Oh (1–3) || Drake (1) || 36–32 || 45,228 || W3/Box
|-style="background:#cfc"
| 69 || June 16 || Padres || 7:10 pm || 6–5 (10) || Hughes (3–1) || Buchter (3–3) ||  || 37–32 || 31,161 || W4/Box
|-style="background:#fbb"
| 70 || June 17 || Padres || 3:10 pm || 5–7 (11) || Torres (4–2) || Drake (2–2) || Maton (1) || 37–33 || 34,312 || L1/Box
|-style="background:#cfc"
| 71 || June 18 || Padres || 1:10 pm || 2–1 || Nelson (5–3) || Perdomo (1–4) ||  || 38–33 || 34,518 || W1/Box 
|-style="background:#fbb"
| 72 || June 19 || Pirates || 6:40 pm || 1–8 || Cole (5–6) || Garza (3–3) ||  || 38–34 || 25,489 || L1/Box 
|-style="background:#fbb"
| 73 || June 20 || Pirates || 6:40 pm || 3–7 || Kuhl (2–6) || Davies (7–4) ||  || 38–35 || 23,982 || L2/Box 
|-style="background:#cfc"
| 74 || June 21 || Pirates || 7:10 pm || 4–3 || Drake (3–2) || Hudson (1–3) || Knebel (11) || 39–35 || 25,134 || W1/Box
|-style="background:#cfc"
| 75 || June 22 || Pirates || 1:10 pm || 4–2 || Anderson (6–2) || Nova (7–5) || Knebel (12) || 40–35 || 28,428 || W2/Box
|-style="background:#fbb"
| 76 || June 23 || @ Braves || 6:35 pm || 4–5 || Foltynewicz (5–5) || Nelson (5–4) || Vizcaíno (1) || 40–36 || 30,521 || L1/Box
|-style="background:#fbb"
| 77 || June 24 || @ Braves || 3:10 pm || 1–3 || Dickey (6–5) || Garza (3–4) || Johnson (15) || 40–37 || 38,463 || L2/Box
|-style="background:#cfc"
| 78 || June 25 || @ Braves || 12:35pm || 7–0 || Davies (8–4) || Teherán (6–6) ||  || 41–37 || 31,634 || W1/Box
|-style="background:#fbb"
| 79 || June 27 || @ Reds || 6:10 pm || 6–8 || Adleman (5–4) || Guerra (1–2) || Iglesias (13) || 41–38 || 18,577 || L1/Box
|-style="background:#fbb"
| 80 || June 28 || @ Reds || 6:10 pm || 3–4 || Storen (2–2) || Knebel (0–1) || Iglesias (14) || 41–39 || 21,842 || L2/Box
|-style="background:#cfc"
| 81 || June 29 || @ Reds || 6:10 pm || 11–3 || Nelson (6–4) || Bailey (0–2) ||  || 42–39 || 20,419 || W1/Box 
|-style="background:#cfc"
| 82|| June 30 || Marlins || 7:10 pm || 3–2 || Torres (4–4) || Phelps (2–4) || Knebel (13) || 43–39 || 35,549 || W2/Box

|-style="background:#cfc"
| 83 || July 1 || Marlins || 3:10 pm || 8–4 || Davies (9–4) || Koehler (1–3) ||  || 44–39 || 30,712 || W3/Box 
|-style="background:#fbb"
| 84 || July 2 || Marlins || 1:10 pm || 3–10 || Straily (6–4) || Guerra (1–3) ||  || 44–40 || 33,834 || L1/Box
|-style="background:#cfc"
| 85 || July 3 || Orioles || 1:10 pm || 8–1 || Suter (1–1) || Miley (3–7) ||  || 45–40 ||36,457|| W1/Box
|-style="background:#cfc"
| 86 || July 4 || Orioles || 3:10 pm || 6–2 || Nelson (7–4) || Jiménez (3–4) ||  || 46–40 || 31,818 || W2/Box
|-style="background:#cfc"
| 87 || July 5 || Orioles || 7:10 pm || 4–0 || Garza (4–4) || Aquino (1–2) ||  || 47–40 || 27,734 || W3/Box 
|-style="background:#cfc"
| 88 || July 6 || @ Cubs || 1:20 pm || 11–2 || Davies (10–4) || Montgomery (1–6) || || 48–40 || 41,576 || W4/Box 
|-style="background:#cfc"
| 89 || July 7 || @ Yankees || 6:05 pm || 9–4 || Hader (1–0) || Clippard (1–5) ||  || 49–40 || 43,472 || W5/Box 
|-style="background:#fbb"
| 90 || July 8 || @ Yankees || 12:05pm || 3–5 || Chapman (2–0) || Knebel (0–2) ||  || 49–41 || 40,224 || L1/Box
|-style="background:#cfc"
| 91 || July 9 || @ Yankees || 12:05pm || 5–3 || Nelson (8–4) || Tanaka (7–8) || Knebel (14) || 50–41 || 43,952 || W1/Box
|-style="background:
|- style="text-align:center; background:#bbcaff;"
| colspan="11" | 88th All-Star Game in Miami, Florida
|-style="background:#cfc"
| 92 || July 14 || Philles || 7:10 pm || 9–6 || Davies (11–4) || Pivetta (2–5) || Knebel (15) || 51–41 || 41,941 || W2/Box
|-style="background:#cfc"
| 93 || July 15 || Phillies || 6:10 pm || 3–2 || Barnes (2–1) || Benoit (1–4) || Knebel (16) || 52–41 || 37,950 || W3/Box
|-style="background:#fbb"
| 94 || July 16 || Phillies || 1:10 pm || 2–5 || Hellickson (6–5) || Scahill (1–3) || Neris (8) || 52–42 || 41,747 || L1/Box
|-style="background:#fbb"
| 95 || July 17 || @ Pirates || 6:05 pm || 2–4 || Hudson (2–4) || Hader (1–1) || Rivero (7) || 52–43 || 18,506 || L2/Box
|-style="background:#fbb"
| 96 || July 18 || @ Pirates || 6:05 pm || 3–4 || Nova (10–6) || Drake (3–3) || Rivero (8) || 52–44 || 20,462 || L3/Box
|-style="background:#fbb"
| 97 || July 19 || @ Pirates || 6:05 pm || 2–3 (10) || Watson (5–2) || Hughes (3–2) ||  || 52–45 || 24,401 || L4/Box
|-style="background:#fbb"
| 98 || July 20 || @ Pirates || 11:35am || 2–4 || Taillon (6–3) || Nelson (8–5) || Rivero (9) || 52–46 || 33,493 || L5/Box
|-style="background:#fbb"
| 99 || July 21 || @ Phillies || 6:05 pm || 1–6 || Nola (7–6) || Garza (4–5) ||  || 52–47 || 17,550 || L6/Box
|-style="background:#cfc"
| 100 || July 22 || @ Phillies || 6:05 pm || 9–8 || Barnes (3–1) || Neris (2–4) || Knebel (17) || 53–47 || 17,712 || W1/Box 
|-style="background:#fbb"
| 101 || July 23 || @ Phillies || 12:35pm || 3–6 || Eickhoff (2–7) || Guerra (1–4) || García (1) || 53–48 || 21,258 || L1/Box 
|-style="background:#cfc"
| 102 || July 25 || @ Nationals || 6:05 pm || 8–0 || Davies (12–4) || Jackson (1–1) ||  || 54–48 || 28,428 || W1/Box
|-style="background:#fbb"
| 103 || July 26 || @ Nationals || 6:05 pm || 5–8 || Madson (3–4) || Barnes (3–2) ||  || 54–49 || 35,296 || L1/Box
|-style="background:#fbb"
| 104 || July 27 || @ Nationals || 11:05am || 2–15 || Scherzer (12–5) || Blazek (0–1) ||  || 54–50 || 32,118 || L2/Box
|-style="background:#cfc"
| 105 || July 28 || Cubs || 7:10 pm || 2–1 || Suter (2–1) || Quintana (6–9) || Knebel (18) || 55–50 || 42,574 || W1/Box
|-style="background:#fbb"
| 106 || July 29 || Cubs || 6:10 pm || 1–2 (11) || Montgomery (3–6) || Hughes (3–3) || Davis (21) || 55–51 || 44,709 || L1/Box
|-style="background:#fbb"
| 107 || July 30 || Cubs || 1:10 pm || 2–4 || Lackey (8–9) || Davies (12–5) || Davis (22) || 55–52 || 44,269 || L2/Box 

|-style="background:#cfc"
| 108 || August 1 || Cardinals || 6:40 pm || 3–2 || Nelson (9–5) || Martínez (7–9) || Knebel (19) || 56–52 || 30,150 || W1/Box
|-style="background:#fbb"
| 109 || August 2 || Cardinals || 7:10 pm || 4–5 || Weaver (1–1) || Suter (2–2) || Rosenthal (7) || 56–53 || 34,433 || L1/Box
|-style="background:#cfc"
| 110 || August 3 || Cardinals || 1:10 pm || 2–1 || Garza (5–5) || Cecil (1–4) || Knebel (20) || 57–53 || 40,170 || W1/Box
|-style="background:#cfc"
| 111 || August 4 || @ Rays || 6:10 pm || 2–0 || Woodruff (1–0) || Faria (5–2) || Knebel (21) || 58–53 || 21,164 || W2/Box
|-style="background:#cfc"
| 112 || August 5 || @ Rays || 5:10 pm || 3–0 || Davies (13–5) || Cobb (9–8) || Swarzak (2) || 59–53 || 15,849 || W3/Box
|-style="background:#fbb"
| 113 || August 6 || @ Rays || 12:10pm || 1–2 || Hunter (1–2) || Barnes (3–3) ||  || 59–54 || 12,129 || L1/Box
|-style="background:#fbb"
| 114 || August 7 || @ Twins || 7:10 pm || 4–5 || Boshers (1–0) || Drake (3–4) || Belisle (2) || 59–55 || 31,339 || L2/Box
|-style="background:#fbb"
| 115 || August 8 || @ Twins || 7:10 pm || 4–11 || Duffey (1–3) || Garza (5–6) || Gee (1) || 59–56 || 34,185 || L3/Box
|-style="background:#fbb"
| 116 || August 9 || Twins || 7:10 pm || 0–4 || Colón (4–9) || Woodruff (1–1) ||  || 59–57 || 30,174 || L4/Box
|-style="background:#fbb"
| 117 || August 10 || Twins || 7:10 pm || 2–7 || Busenitz (1–0) || Davies (13–6) ||  || 59–58 || 33,904 || L5/Box 
|-style="background:#fbb"
| 118 || August 11 || Reds || 7:10 pm || 10–11 || Bailey (4–6) || Nelson (9–6) || Iglesias (20) || 59–59 || 34,517 || L6/Box
|-style="background:#cfc"
| 119 || August 12 || Reds || 6:10 pm || 6–5 (10) || Knebel (1–2) || Adleman (5–10) ||  || 60–59 || 38,256 || W1/Box
|-style="background:#cfc"
| 120 || August 13 || Reds || 1:10 pm || 7–4 || Garza (6–6) || Romano (2–5) || Knebel (22) || 61–59 || 43,248 || W2/Box 
|-style="background:#cfc"
| 121 || August 15 || Pirates || 6:40 pm || 3–1 || Davies (14–6) || Nova (10–10) || Knebel (23) || 62–59 || 32,605 || W3/Box
|-style="background:#cfc"
| 122 || August 16 || Pirates || 1:10 pm || 7–6 || Swarzak (5–3) || Nicasio (1–5) || Knebel (24) || 63–59 || 32,439 || W4/Box
|-style="background:#fbb"
| 123 || August 18 || @ Rockies || 7:40 pm || 4–8 || Márquez (10–5) || Garza (6–7) ||  || 63–60 || 32,385 || L1/Box
|-style="background:#cfc"
| 124 || August 19 || @ Rockies || 7:10 pm || 6–3 || Swarzak (6–3) || Holland (2–4) || Knebel (25) || 64–60 || 47,216 || W1/Box
|-style="background:#cfc"
| 125 || August 20 || @ Rockies || 2:10 pm || 8–4 || Anderson (7–2) || Freeland (11–8) || Knebel (26) || 65–60 || 34,426 || W2/Box
|-style="background:#fbb"
| 126 || August 21 || @ Giants || 9:15 pm || 0–2 || Stratton (2–2) || Davies (14–7) || Dyson (11) || 65–61 || 39,341 || L1/Box
|-style="background:#cfc"
| 127 || August 22 || @ Giants || 9:15 pm || 4–3 || Jeffress (1–0) || Suárez (0–3) || Knebel (27) || 66–61 || 39,523 || W1/Box
|-style="background:#fbb"
| 128 || August 23 || @ Giants || 2:45 pm || 2–4 || Strickland (3–3) || Barnes (3–4) || Dyson (12) || 66–62 || 40,015 || L1/Box
|-style="background:#fbb"
| 129 || August 25 || @ Dodgers || 9:10 pm || 1–3 || Maeda (12–5) || Anderson (7–3) || Jansen (35) || 66–63 || 52,455 || L2/Box
|-style="background:#cfc"
| 130 || August 26 || @ Dodgers || 8:10 pm || 3–0 || Davies (15–7) || Ravin (0–1) || Knebel (28) || 67–63 || 52,345 || W1/Box
|-style="background:#cfc"
| 131 || August 27 || @ Dodgers || 3:10 pm || 3–2 || Nelson (10–6) || Darvish (8–10) || Knebel (29) || 68–63 || 51,355 || W2/Box
|-style="background:#fbb"
| 132 || August 29 || Cardinals || 6:40 pm || 2–10 || Weaver (3–1) || Garza (6–8) ||  || 68–64 || 31,985 || L1/Box
|-style="background:#cfc"
| 133 || August 30 || Cardinals || 1:10 pm || 6–5 || Anderson (8–3) || Martínez (10–10) || Knebel (30) || 69–64 || 28,964 || W1/Box
|-style="background:#cfc"
| 134 || August 31 || Nationals || 7:10 pm || 6–3 || Davies (16–7) || González (13–6) || Knebel (31) || 70–64 || 26,384 || W2/Box

|-style="background:#cfc"
| 135 || September 1 || Nationals || 7:10 pm || 1–0 || Nelson (11–6) || Roark (11–9) || Knebel (32) || 71–64 || 40,044 || W3/Box
|-style="background:#fbb"
| 136 || September 2 || Nationals || 6:10 pm || 2–3 || Madson (5–4) || Hader (1–2) || Doolittle (17) || 71–65 || 35,341 || L1/Box
|-style="background:#cfc"
| 137 || September 3 || Nationals || 1:10 pm || 7–2 || Jeffress (3–2) || Jackson (5–4) ||  || 72–65 || 36,937 || W1/Box
|-style="background:#fbb"
| 138 || September 4 || @ Reds || 12:10 pm || 4–5 || Iglesias (3–2) || Hader (1–3) ||  || 72–66 || 22,403 || L1/Box
|-style="background:#fbb"
| 139 || September 5 || @ Reds || 6:10 pm || 3–9 || Stephenson (4–4) || Davies (16–8) || Iglesias (25) || 72–67 || 12,135 || L2/Box
|-style="background:#fbb"
| 140 || September 6 || @ Reds || 11:35am || 1–7 || Castillo (3–7) || Garza (6–9) ||  || 72–68 || 12,626 || L3/Box
|-style="background:#cfc"
| 141 || September 8 || @ Cubs || 7:05 pm || 2–0 || Nelson (12–6) || Lackey (11–11) || Knebel (33) || 73–68 || 41,020 || W1/Box
|-style="background:#cfc"
| 142 || September 9 || @ Cubs || 3:05 pm || 15–2 || Anderson (9–3) || Montgomery (5–8) ||  || 74–68 || 41,167 || W2/Box
|-style="background:#cfc"
| 143 || September 10 || @ Cubs || 1:20 pm || 3–1 || Davies (17–8) || Hendricks (6–5) || Knebel (34) || 75–68 || 40,113 || W3/Box
|-style="background:#fbb"
| 144 || September 11 || Pirates || 6:40 pm || 0–7 || Brault (1–0) || Woodruff (1–2) ||  || 75–69 || 27,422 || L1/Box
|-style="background:#cfc"
| 145 || September 12 || Pirates || 6:40 pm || 5–2 || Jeffress (4–2) || Cole (11–10) || Knebel (35) || 76–69 || 30,331 || W1/Box 
|-style="background:#cfc"
| 146 || September 13 || Pirates || 7:10 pm || 8–2 || Anderson (10–3) || Glasnow (2–7) || — || 77–69 || 27,436 || W2/Box
|-style="background:#cfc"
| 147 || September 15 || Marlins || 7:10 pm || 10–2 || Hughes (4–3) || Ellington (0–1) || — || 78–69 || 19,369 || W3/Box
|-style="background:#fbb"
| 148 || September 16 || Marlins || 6:10 pm || 4–7 || Conley (7–7) || Davies (17–9) || — || 78–70 || 25,079 || L1/Box
|-style="background:#cfc"
| 149 || September 17 || Marlins || 1:10pm || 10–3 || Woodruff (2–2) || Peters (0–2) ||  || 79–70 || 24,535 || W1/Box
|-style="background:#cfc"
| 150 || September 18 || @ Pirates || 6:05 pm || 3–0 || Suter (3–2) || Taillon (7–7) || Knebel (36) || 80–70 || 16,283 || W2/Box
|-style="background:#cfc"
| 151 || September 19 || @ Pirates || 6:05 pm || 1–0 || Anderson (11–3) || Williams (6–9) || Knebel (37) || 81–70 || 13,929 || W3/Box
|-style="background:#fbb"
| 152 || September 20 || @ Pirates || 6:05 pm || 4–6 || Rivero (5–2) || Knebel (1–3) ||  || 81–71 || 15,741 || L1/Box 
|-style="background:#fbb"
| 153 || September 21 || Cubs || 7:10 pm || 3–5 (10) || Davis (4–1) || Drake (3–5) ||  || 81–72 || 35,114 || L2/Box
|-style="background:#fbb"
| 154 || September 22 || Cubs || 6:35 pm || 4–5 (10) || Edwards (5–4) || Knebel (1–4) ||  || 81–73 || 40,116 || L3/Box 
|-style="background:#cfc"
| 155 || September 23 || Cubs || 12:05 pm || 4–3 (10) || Jeffress (5–2) || Davis (4–2) ||  || 82–73 || 44,067 || W1/Box
|-style="background:#fbb"
| 156 || September 24 || Cubs || 1:10 pm || 0–5 || Quintana (11–11) || Anderson (11–4) ||  || 82–74 || 42,212 || L1/Box 
|-style="background:#cfc"
| 157 || September 26 || Reds || 6:40 pm || 7–6 || Hader (2–3) || McGuire (0–1) || Knebel (38) || 83–74 || 30,079 || W1/Box
|-style="background:#fbb"
| 158 || September 27 || Reds || 7:10 pm || 0–6 || Bailey (6–9) || Woodruff (2–3) ||  || 83–75 || 34,882 || L1/Box
|-style="background:#cfc"
| 159 || September 28 || Reds || 3:10 pm || 4–3 || Hughes (5–3) || Romano (5–8) || Knebel (39) || 84–75 || 30,293 || W1/Box
|-style="background:#cfc"
| 160 || September 29 || @ Cardinals || 7:15 pm || 5–3 || Anderson (12–4) || Gant (0–1) ||  || 85–75 || 44,815 || W2/Box 
|-style="background:#fbb"
| 161 || September 30 || @ Cardinals || 3:15 pm || 6–7 || Sherriff (2–1) || Swarzak (6–4) || Nicasio (6) || 85–76 || 42,246 || L1/Box
|-style="background:#cfc"
| 162 || October 1 || @ Cardinals || 2:15 pm || 6–1 || Wilkerson' (1–0) || Flaherty (0–2) ||  || 86–76 || 44,787 || W1/Box

| 

Detailed Records

Roster

 Statistics 

 Batting Players in bold are on the active MLB roster as of 2022.Note: G = Games played; AB = At bats; R = Runs; H = Hits; 2B = Doubles; 3B = Triples; HR = Home runs; RBI = Runs batted in; SB = Stolen bases; BB = Walks; K = Strikeouts; AVG = Batting average; OBP = On-base percentage; SLG = Slugging percentage; TB = Total bases Pitching Players in bold are on the active MLB roster as of 2022.Note: W = Wins; L = Losses; ERA = Earned run average; G = Games pitched; GS = Games started; SV = Saves; IP = Innings pitched; H = Hits allowed; R = Runs allowed; ER = Earned runs allowed; HR = Home runs allowed; BB = Walks allowed; K = StrikeoutsFarm system

The Brewers' farm system consisted of eight minor league affiliates in 2017. The Brewers operated a Dominican Summer League team as a co-op with the Cleveland Indians.

References

External links
2017 Milwaukee Brewers season at Baseball Reference''
Milwaukee Brewers season Official Site 

Milwaukee Brewers seasons
Milwaukee Brewers
Milwaukee Brewers